Barhadbshabba may refer to:

Barhadbshabba Arbaya (late 6th or early 7th  century), Nestorian historian
Barhadbshabba of Hulwan (late 6th or early 7th  century), Nestorian bishop, possibly identical with the prec.